Numerous plants have been introduced to the state of New South Wales, Australia during the past two centuries, and many of them have become invasive species or noxious weeds which by definition compete with native plants and suppress the growth of indigenous populations. NSW has over 340 weeds, though only one-third are considered noxious, which were purposefully introduced as garden and farmland plants, and thus had escaped. They generally consist of agricultural, scrub, aquatic, roadside and allergenic weeds.

Weeds threaten more than 40% of NSW threatened species (which are predominantly plants) and around 90% of endangered ecological communities. An excess of $50 million of public money (half which come from state government) is currently being spent on weed control. Despite the efforts, the control is not keeping up with their invasiveness, and the NSW Government has granted that it is unlikely to surpass its 2015 goal of ‘a reduction in the impact of invasive species’.

Weeds are threat to the state's natural environment and would jeopardise many native plants and animals in NSW. They would also effect the price of food, human condition (allergies and asthma), recreational activities and the economy of New South Wales. The harmful impact of weeds is increasing fast as more species are introduced and dispersed into new areas. General, state or regional biosecurity duties under the Biosecurity Act 2015 are presented for each weed.

Weed classification
This is the Noxious Weeds Act 1993:
Class 1: State prohibited weeds (Risk Rating 1 - Very High Risk) – Plants that pose a potentially serious threat to primary production or the environment and are not present in the State, or are present only to a limited extent. They must be eradicated from the land and the land must be kept free of the plant. In other words, these plants have not invaded NSW yet, but should prevented from introduction and establishment in the state. The entire state of NSW command the destruction of noxious weeds that fall under this class and keeping the entire state free of such plant. The existence of the plant must be notified to the local control authority. 
Class 2: Regionally prohibited weeds (Risk Rating 2 - High Risk) – Plants that pose a potentially serious threat to primary production or the environment of a region to which the order applies and are not present in the region, or are present only to a limited extent. They must be eradicated from the land and the land must be kept free of the plant. These plants have also not invaded NSW yet, but should prevented from introduction and establishment only in certain LGAs.
Class 3: Regionally controlled weeds (Risk Rating 3 - Medium Risk) – Plants that pose a potentially serious threat to primary production or the environment of an area to which the order applies, are not widely distributed in the area, and are likely to spread within the area or to another area. They must be fully and continuously suppressed and destroyed. Invasive plants here have established to an extent, but must be reduced in the area and in their impact in parts of the state. The region or LGA area should ceaselessly subdue and destroy class 3 weeds to decrease the negative impacts of their infestation. Some are also prohibited from sale or distribution.
Class 4: Locally controlled weeds (Risk Rating 4 - Marginal Risk) – Plants that pose a potentially serious threat to primary production, the environment or human health, are widely distributed in an area to which the order applies and are likely to spread in the area or to another area. The growth of the plant must be managed in a way that reduces its numbers, spread and incidence, and continually stops reproducing. The plant must not be sold, propagated or knowingly distributed. Due to their establishment, the LGAs should control the spread of class 4 noxious weeds to lessen their numbers, dispersal, and to reduce their growth endlessly. The local council should also decrease their negative impacts on agriculture, community, and environment. The plant may not be sold, propagated or intentionally distributed in some LGAs.
Class 5: Restricted plants (Risk Rating 5 - Low Risk) – Plants that are likely, by their sale or the sale of their seeds or movement within the state or an area of the state, to spread in the state or outside the state. Owners or occupiers of land must notify their local control authorities if they're aware of the spread of these weeds on land. These plants should prevented from introduction and establishment within the state or from NSW to another state. The state restricts weeds that haven’t been established yet or are scarcely present. The state also forbids merchandising weeds that were originally garden or aquarium plants which have the power to become noxious weeds.

Priority weeds
The Biosecurity Act 2015 restricts those that trade or transport plants (called 'priority weeds') that damage the state's environment, economy and community. The restrictions apply to all parts of the plant, such as cuttings, cultivars and hybrids. 'State priority weeds' are banned from being sold in NSW. 'Regional priority weeds' should not be sold or transported in certain regions of NSW.  Those that buy or sell them are committing an offence, where they can be issued with hefty penalties. These legal rules apply:

 "Prohibited Matter – A person who deals with prohibited matter or a carrier of prohibited matter is guilty of an offence. The definition of 'dealing' is broad and includes having, buying, selling, moving, growing and disposal."
 "Control Order – Requires all parts of the plant to be destroyed until eradicated."
 "Mandatory Measure (Prohibition on Dealings) – Must not be imported into the State or sold."

Lists

Common weeds

Plants listed below are widespread weeds in parts of the state, found particularly in disturbed areas, parks and/or house gardens. Some are no longer commonly grown, while others are still cultivated. Some are invasive species that pose a threat to native fauna and flora, and are in the class 3 or 4 categories (a few are prohibited for purchase or propagation in some local government areas), whilst others are not considered noxious by any state government authorities:

Anredera cordifolia* (Madeira-vine)
Senna pendula (Easter cassia)
Solanum mauritianum (woolly nightshade)
Vinca major (blue perrywinkle)
Acacia baileyana (Cootamundra wattle)
Lomandra hystrix (river reed)
Acetosa sagittata (turkey rhubarb)
Ochna serrulata (Mickey Mouse plant)
Soliva sessilis (bindii)
Arctotheca calendula (capeweed)
Ageratina adenophora (crofton Weed)
Stellaria media (chickweed)
Lantana camara* (common lantana)
Parietaria judaica (asthma weed)
Pinus radiata (radiata pine)
Ricinus communis (castor oil plant)
Passiflora suberosa (corky passion vine)
Ipomoea cairica (Cairo morning glory)
Araujia sericifera (cruel vine)
Tropaeolum majus (garden nasturtium)
Ailanthus altissima (tree of heaven)
Dietes iridioides (wild Iris)
Phyla canescens (lippia)
Acacia saligna (golden wreath wattle)
Andropogon virginicus (whisky grass)
Cardamine hirsuta (flick weed)
Ageratina riparia (mistflower)
Sphagneticola trilobata (Singapore daisy)
Ludwigia peruviana (primrose yellow)
Erigeron karvinskianus (seaside daisy)
Cardiospermum grandiflorum (balloon vine creeper)
Ipomoea indica (purple morning glory)
Tradescantia fluminensis (wandering jew)
Opuntia ficus-indica (prickly pear)
Sonchus oleraceus (milk thistle)
Nephrolepis cordifolia (fishbone fern)
Coreopsis lanceolata (lance-leaved coreopsis)
Rhaphiolepis indica (Indian hawthorn)
Ligustrum sinense (small-leaved privet)
Senecio madagascariensis (fireweed)
Taraxacum officinale (common dandelion)
Dolichandra unguis-cati* (cats claw creeper)
Olea europaea subsp. cuspidata (African olive)
Cestrum parqui (green cestrum)
Convolvulus arvensis (common bindweed)
Ligustrum lucidum (Chinese privet)
Kalanchoe delagoensis (chandelier plant)
Cinnamomum camphora (camphor laurel)
Erythrina crista-galli (cockspur coral tree)
Ardisia crenata (coral berry)
Duranta erecta (golden dewdrop)
Ochna serrulata (Mickey mouse plant)
Oxalis corniculata (creeping woodsorrel) 
Conyza (fleabane)
Xanthium strumarium (rough cocklebur)
Asparagus aethiopicus* (asparagus fern)
Cardamine hirsuta (flickweed)
Nothoscordum gracile (fragrant onion)
Cyperus rotundus (nutgrass)
Portulaca oleracea (common purslane)
Hypochaeris radicata (flatweed)
Parietaria judaica (pellitory of the wall)
Urtica urens (small nettle)
Trifolium repens (white clover)

Those marked with an asterisk are a Weed of National Significance.

Noxious weeds
Plants listed below, which tend to be sparsely distributed and not as commonly as the above species, are noxious weeds that should not to be sold in parts of New South Wales due to their invasive nature (most listed here are a 'Weed of National Significance'):

Prohibited species
Plants listed below are presently Prohibited Matter in the Biosecurity Act 2015. These plants are banned for importation into NSW and are not yet present in the state. Any person that deals with a Prohibited Matter plant is guilty of an offence. They are generally categorized under Class 1 (state prohibited weeds):

See also
Weeds of National Significance
Invasive species in Australia

References

Attribution 
 Parts of this Wikipedia article contains material from Weed categories - Plants not to be sold in all or parts of NSW, published by the Government of New South Wales under CC-BY 3.0 AU licence (accessed on 11 March 2021).

External links
Priority weeds for NSW

New South Wales
 New South Wales
Environment of New South Wales
Environmental issues in Australia
New South Wales